Original War is a real-time strategy video game developed by Czech company Altar Interactive and released by Virgin Interactive on June 15, 2001. It was re-released in the United Kingdom under the budget Sold Out label in 2004, and was later re-released again by Good Old Games in 2008.

In North America, the game was part of a $20 budget range from Titus Interactive which was branded using the Virgin Interactive name alongside Screamer 4x4, Codename: Outbreak and Nightstone.

The game received a PEGI 18 rating, citing discrimination.

Plot
The game's story revolves around an extraterrestrial mineral, Siberite, that can catalyze cold fusion and serve as fuel for an alien artifact. Siberite and the artifact – named EON – are discovered by an American expedition to Russia during World War I. EON is revealed to be a time machine capable of sending objects into the past, but by the time of the discovery, Siberite stocks are exhausted and research stops. Then in the new millennium vast deposits of the mineral are found in Siberia, and Americans are able to extract enough of it for small-scale time-travel.

The U.S. comes up with a plan to send a small force two million years back in time. There it will mine the Siberite and transport it over the Bering Land Bridge to Alaska, into what will one day be in American hands. The best troops are selected, briefed, and told that it is a one-way trip back through time.

This results in a new time line with the mineral located in Alaska and the U.S. being the only undisputed superpower thanks to the inexhaustible source of energy. Here the time machine wasn't found by the U.S. but the Russians instead. The Soviet Union fumes under American supremacy. Frustration turns to outrage when Soviet scientists find traces of American settlement and Alaskite, the source of U.S. power, in remote Siberia. A Soviet expedition is sent through the EON, here called TAWAR, to repel the American thieves and preserve what is rightfully theirs.

The game story is loosely based on the sci-fi novel The Last Day of Creation (1981) by Wolfgang Jeschke.

Gameplay

Original War is an RTS: the player builds a base, finds resources, builds vehicles, and destroys the enemy. Its distinguishing feature is the way the game mechanics reflect the backstory's scarcity of resources and isolation.

It is not possible to train new men. Moreover, the same units who fight are needed for resource gathering and the bases' functions. Production facilities, research labs, vehicles and base defenses are all useless unmanned. The local apemen can be trained to do simple tasks, and with the right research it is possible to use remote control and AIs, but all are generally worse in combat than humans. Losses in personnel are otherwise irreplaceable.

Units do not fight to the end. Critical damage causes humans and apemen to collapse, and vehicles and buildings to eject their occupants and catch fire. They can be saved if they are healed or repaired before they bleed out or explode, respectively. Units give lower priority to incapacitated targets, and the player's units will not attack them unless ordered to. Vehicles without drivers belong to no one, so hijacking is easy and even desirable.

Original War is "almost as much an RPG as a RTS". Each human or apeman unit has its own name and portrait, speed, firepower and defense scores, and experience levels in each of the game's four classes. Humans can change class (or "kit") in seconds by ducking into an appropriate building. Soldiers deal and withstand much more damage, can crawl, and receive huge bonuses while in emplacements. Engineers can haul resources, initiate the construction of new buildings, and repair and dismantle buildings. Mechanics can construct and repair vehicles, and receive equally huge bonuses while driving them. Scientists are researchers, healers, and apeman tamers. Units gain XP and level up in a skill by performing actions associated with the skill. XP gain is faster for units with the associated kit.

The game has three types of resources: Crates, oil and Crystals. Supply crates sent from the future are the foundation of all construction. Small piles of crates appear on the map with a thunderclap at random intervals. Most maps in the game have regions where crates appear the most often. American optoelectronics enable them to pinpoint the exact locations of the crates as they arrive, while the Soviets, who have focused on time-based technology, are able to predict a perimeter where the crates will arrive a few seconds before they materialise.

Oil and the varyingly named mineral power bases and vehicles. Scientists can locate their deposits, and constructing a tower or mine on a deposit generates a steady stream of the resource. This may be the only base function that works automatically. Oil is used mostly early- and midgame as a cheap yet readily available power source. Oil-burning vehicles have fuel meters. They can be refueled at a base or by transporting oil to them, and the driver can get out and push. The crystal allows vehicles to run indefinitely, and opens up several advanced research topics. Solar power is also available. Solar-based fuel reserves are pitiful, but they regenerate.

Original War has an American and a Soviet campaign. The game recommends playing the American one first. Missions on both sides tend to contain scripted events, multiple-choice situations and sidequests. Human units persist between missions, so that each loss is a loss for the rest of the game. Mission design keeps the ranks from becoming too thin or too thick: for instance, the player might be ordered to choose eight men altogether from veterans of previous missions and other members of the side, go defend an outpost, and return after the mission. Units also gain XP for completing missions. The XP gained increases farther into the game, and is affected by the player's success in completing the various demands (often sidequests) in each mission. The player chooses one class for each unit to receive 50% of the xp, and the other three skills gain the remaining 50% between them.

A third campaign was in development, featuring an Arab-German faction. As it included kamikaze units, it was scrapped as being politically incorrect in the wake of the September 11 attacks.

History

Community support
In January/February 2005 a member of the game's community, Stuart "Stucuk" Carey, asked Altar Interactive (now known as Altar Games) for permission to maintain Original War with patches. Altar Interactive agreed and gave access to the source code. Later in June, work began on the first patch v1.03, which primarily added basic Mod support to Original War.

Multiplayer
Originally the only way to play Original War over the internet was through GameSpy Arcade. In 2007, starting with version 1.09 however, the game features a working master server hosted by Original War Support, and an IRC based chat system that allows people to set up or join multiplayer matches from an ingame menu. In July 2011 the community website Original-war.net released a working version of a multiplayer ranking system that records the outcomes of matches and displays them online.

Reception
The Finnish Pelit magazine gave Original War a score of 82% in a two-page review. Reviewer Aleksi Stenberg wrote that the plot and the unusual gameplay made the game more interesting than a dozen Red Alerts. He warmed up to Original War at a time when he had grown weary with the genre. He also complimented the interface. He criticized overspecialized character classes, the vehicles' designs, and the voice acting.

The Finnish general computing magazine MikroBITTI awarded the game 91%. Its review praised the game's playability and mentioned voice acting as the only clearly negative feature.

The reviewer for the Polish game portal GRYOnline noted that the game sold well in Poland and Czechia, and in both countries developed a cult following.

References

External links
 Official website
 Original War Support
 
 

2001 video games
Alternate history video games
Real-time tactics video games
Video games with Steam Workshop support
Temporal war fiction
Titus Software games
Video games about time travel
Video games based on novels
Video games developed in the Czech Republic
Video games set in Alaska
Video games set in Russia
Video games set in the United States
Video games with alternate endings
Virgin Interactive games
War video games
Windows games
Windows-only games